Węglewo may refer to the following places in Poland:
Węglewo, Trzebnica County in Lower Silesian Voivodeship (south-west Poland)
Węglewo, Wołów County in Lower Silesian Voivodeship (south-west Poland)
Węglewo, Piła County in Greater Poland Voivodeship (west-central Poland)
Węglewo, Poznań County in Greater Poland Voivodeship (west-central Poland)
Węglewo, Pomeranian Voivodeship (north Poland)
Węglewo, West Pomeranian Voivodeship (north-west Poland)